Transformations is an album by saxophonist Bunky Green recorded in New York and released by the Vanguard label in 1977.

Reception

AllMusic reviewer Scott Yanow stated: "The first of three recordings that altoist Bunky Green made for Vanguard in the mid- to late 1970s is a fine all-around effort with Green performing three originals and uplifting three pop songs ... Green sounds fine on this set, displaying a distinctive tone and an inquisitive musical spirit.".

Track listing 
All compositions by Bunky Green, except where indicated.
 "I Won't Last a Day Without You" (Roger Nichols, Paul Williams) – 6:24
 "Europa" (Carlos Santana, Tom Coster) – 7:55
 "Feelings" (Loulou Gasté, Morris Albert) – 7:33
 "Lady from Ancona" – 3:31
 "Chillon" – 8:19
 "Funk Ain't a Word" – 9:40

Personnel 
Bunky Green - alto saxophone
Clark Terry – trumpet (track 3)
Billy Butler, Carl Lynch – guitar
Al Dailey – piano
Wilbur Bascomb – bass
Jimmy Johnson – drums
Al Chalk – percussion

References 

1977 albums
Vanguard Records albums
Bunky Green albums